George Edmund Womack (April 27, 1898 – June 7, 1928) was an American Negro league catcher in the 1920s.

A native of Tennessee, Womack played for the St. Louis Stars in 1924. He died in St. Louis, Missouri in 1928 at age 30.

References

External links
 and Seamheads

1898 births
1928 deaths
Place of birth missing
St. Louis Stars (baseball) players
Baseball catchers
Baseball players from Tennessee
20th-century African-American sportspeople